is a Japanese tarento, actress, and former gravure idol who has appeared in a number of television series and variety shows as well as feature films.

She was born in Higashiōsaka, Osaka Prefecture. She is represented with the agency One Eight Promotion.

Awards

Filmography

Television

Dramas

Information, variety programme regular

Other programmes

Films

Direct-to-video

Radio programme regular

Advertisements

Works

Image videos

Bibliography

See also
Gravure idol

References

External links
 
Miho Yoshioka no Gravure*Promo Michi. 
 

Models from Osaka Prefecture
Japanese gravure idols
Japanese television personalities
Japanese actresses
1980 births
Living people
People from Higashiōsaka